Muhammad: The Messenger of God—Original Motion Picture Soundtrack is the soundtrack album composed by A. R. Rahman (featuring the trio Le Trio Joubran) to the 2015 Iranian Islamic epic film of the same name. The film is directed by Majid Majidi and co-written with Kambuzia Partovi. The soundtrack was released by Sony DADC on 23 December 2015.

The soundtrack was adjudged as one of the  "Best Scores of Asia in 2015" by Movie Music UK magazine.

Background
A. R. Rahman's inclusion in the project was confirmed in May 2014. It took six months for A. R. Rahman to understand the kind of score that Majid Majidi wanted for "Muhammad: The Messenger of God". He worked on the score for a year and a half. Singer Sami Yusuf has recorded a track featured only in the film. In November 2014, Rahman recorded with the Le Trio Joubran for the score. Further sessions of recording with the trio were held in Paris by February 2015. Orchestral music was recorded in Berlin.Geoff Foster co-produced the motion picture score with Rahman. The score comprises experimental melodies and rhythms. A. R. Rahman recorded the music along with Dilshaad Shabbir Shaikh son of playback singer Shabbir Kumar, across five countries including India, Iran, Germany, France and Egypt with 200 musicians .

The score of Muhammad: The Messenger of God combines emotional music performed by a symphony orchestra, blended with instruments and vocal soloists.  This brings touches of geographic and historical specificity to the project. The opening track "Prologue – The Infinite Light" is an array of vocals, whispers, and chant which gradually emerges into a brass-led crescendo. The tracks "Signs of the Last Prophet," "The Birth," "Through the Sands," and "And He Was Named Muhammad (SAL)," is choral in arrangement. Tracks "Halima’s (RA) Healing," "A Mother’s Advice to Her Son," "The Last Hajj of Abdul Mutallib (AS)," and "The Sermon," use the voices extrovertly to depict religious feelings. Several cues of the score have traditional orchestral arrangement, especially the usage of strings and woodwinds. The track "Ababeel" is used in an action sequence, centered around brass clusters, drumbeats, and deep choral accents.  The track "The Camel’s Divine Intervention," is upbeat with intricate pieces that layers orchestral music with sounds of oud.

Track listing

Album credits 
Credits adapted from the CD liner notes of soundtrack album.

Choirs and orchestra 
 Music Assistant: Dilshaad Shabbir Shaikh
 Choirs – K.M.M.C. Choir, Babelsberg Choir
 Choir Supervision – Adam Greig, Arjun Chandy
 Orchestra  –Filmochestra Babelsberg
 Orchestrator and conductor – Matt Dunkley
 Orchestra manager – Klaus-Peter Beyer, 
 Backing Vocals
A. R. Raihanah, Isshrath Quadhre, Arpita Gandhi, Arjun Chandy, Saranya Srinivasan, Ameena, Aisha Sayyed, Nitishree, Shashaa Tirupati, Aditi Paul
 Personnel
 Oud – Le Trio Joubran, Additional Oud - Ebrahim Alavi, Tapas Roy
 Ney – Irfan (in Tehran), Kamlakar
 Duduk – Kamlakar
 Saz – Tapas Roy
 Flute – Kamalakar, Naveen Kumar
 Percussion – Youssef Hbeisch
Special credits for the track "Ya Muhammad (SAL)"
 Lyrics – Traditional
 Vocals – A. R. Rahman, Sana Moussa, Dilshaad Shabbir Shaikh, Osama El-Khouly
 Percussions – Hossam Ramzy, Youssef Hbeisch
 Youth choir (from Cairo) – Osama El-Khouly, Ashraf Seleem, Naser Hassan, Ahmad Effat, Jan Boushra
 Children's choir (from Cairo) – Miss. Basant Ashraf, Master Tarek Ashraf, Master Khaled Mohamad, Master Mazen Yosry
 Music engineer – Bassem Sobhy (in Cairo)
 Production
 Score recording and mixing – Geoff Foster 
 Music Assistant - Dilshaad Shabbir Shaikh
 Additional mixing – Ishaan Chhabra
 Score co-ordinator – Arpita Gandhi
 Assistant Scoring Engineers – Vinay Sridhar, Karthik Sekaran
 Engineers – 
 Music Programming – Ishaan Chhabra, Hentry Kuruvilla, Santhosh Dhayanidhi, Jerry Sylvester Vincent, TR Krishna Chetan, Dilshaad Shabbir Shaikh
 Musicians' fixer – R. Samidurai, Vijay Iyer

References

External links
 Muhammad: The Messenger of God (soundtrack) Internet Movie Database

A. R. Rahman soundtracks
2015 soundtrack albums
Film soundtracks